Robo Surf is an iOS game developed by Pieces Interactive AB and released on June 1, 2011.

Gameplay
Players control a surfing robot, and can build waves of different altitudes by tapping and releasing. Players continue until they hit something or crash into the ocean.

Critical reception
The game has a "Generally favorable" rating of Metacritic, garnering a score of 85 reviews based on 4 critics.

Modojo said "Most importantly, the game's a ton of fun and shockingly addictive. It literally came out of nowhere. Kudos to Pieces Interactive for releasing such a well-designed and cool App guaranteed to consume hours of our lives." PocketGamerUK wrote " Solid, simple, and effective controls are the basis for an entertaining one-touch experience. " TouchArcade said " Robo Surf is lighthearted and fun, with enough hooks to turn it from a momentary distraction to one of my new favorites. " Multiplayer.it said " The gameplay of Robo Surf is simple and intuitive, but unfortunately not so addictive, while the lack of variety and unlockable contents might discourage the player. Anyway, it's still a fun game and the cameos from Iji and Blueberry Garden are two nice touches. " AppAdvice reported "It has a 4.5-star rating with a total of 226 ratings."

References

IOS games
IOS-only games
2011 video games
Action video games
Pieces Interactive games
Video games developed in Sweden